Robinose is a disaccharide composed of 6″-O-α-rhamnopyranosyl-β-galactopyranoside.  The sugar can be found in Acalypha hispida.

Robinin is a kaempferol-3-O-robinoside-7-O-rhamnoside.

References 

Disaccharides
Deoxy sugars